Zabrus seidlitzi is a species of ground beetle in the Pelor subgenus that is endemic to Spain.

References

Beetles described in 1864
Beetles of Europe
Endemic fauna of Spain
Zabrus
Taxa named by Hermann Rudolph Schaum